The Immigrant is a 1915 American silent drama film directed by George Melford and starring Valeska Suratt, an actress who specialized in playing vamp roles and who was one of Theda Bara's film rivals. The film is now considered lost.

This was Valeska Suratt's only film away from the Fox Film Studios.

Cast
Valeska Suratt - Masha
Thomas Meighan - David Harding
Theodore Roberts - J.J. Walton
Jane Wolf - Olga (*aka Jane Wolfe)
Hal Clements - John
Ernest Joy - Walton's Partner
Sydney Deane - Walton's secretary
Mrs. Lewis McCord - the stewardess
Bob Fleming - ship's officer
Raymond Hatton - Munsing, Harding's secretary
Gertrude Kellar - Walton's housekeeper

See also
List of Paramount Pictures films

References

External links
 
 

1915 films
1915 drama films
Silent American drama films
American silent feature films
American black-and-white films
Famous Players-Lasky films
Films directed by George Melford
Lost American films
Paramount Pictures films
1915 lost films
Lost drama films
1910s American films